The Men's 100m Backstroke event at the 2003 Pan American Games took place on August 16, 2003 (day 15 of the Games).

Medalists

Records

Results

Notes

References
usaswimming 
2003 Pan American Games Results: Day 15, CBC online; retrieved 2009-06-13.
swimmers-world
Records
SwimNews Results

Backstroke, 100m